Parker Hill is a hill exceeding , located just east of Lake Cowan in the east part of the Vestfold Hills. The hill was the site of a wind-run pole erected by an ANARE (Australian National Antarctic Research Expeditions) party from Davis Station in 1969. Named by Antarctic Names Committee of Australia (ANCA) for Dr. Desmond. Parker, Officer-in-Charge and medical officer at Davis Station in 1969.

Hills of Princess Elizabeth Land
Ingrid Christensen Coast